Pseudopostega microacris is a moth of the family Opostegidae. It is only known from north-eastern Costa Rica in lowland rainforest from 50 to 500 meters elevation.

The length of the forewings is 2.2–2.4 mm. Adults are mostly white. Adults have been collected in January and from October to November.

Etymology
The species name is derived from the Greek mikros (small, little) and akron (top, tip, end) in reference to the diagnostic slender, reduced apex of the caudal lobe of the male gnathos.

External links
A Revision of the New World Plant-Mining Moths of the Family Opostegidae (Lepidoptera: Nepticuloidea)

Opostegidae
Moths described in 2007